North Mountain is a mountain ridge within the Ridge-and-valley Appalachians in the U.S. states of Virginia and West Virginia.

Geography
North Mountain spans  from the Potomac River in the north to the community of Green Spring in Frederick County, Virginia in the south. The ridge is divided into two sections; the north and south spans. The northern span is characterized by lower elevations, its highest point is  just north of Hedgesville, and numerous gaps at valley floor elevations. The southern section also contains many gaps, but all are several hundred feet above the valley floor. Back Creek Valley lies to the mountain ridge's west and the Shenandoah Valley to its east. Back Creek owes its name to North Mountain, as early settlers in the eighteenth century referred to the stream as to the "back" of the ridge when approaching it from the east.

The Roundtop summit was the location of Cowpuncher, a Presidential Emergency Facility serving Washington, D.C., during the Cold War. The facility consisted of microwave communication relay towers.

Variant names
According to the Geographic Names Information System, North Mountain has also widely been known as Great Ridge and Little North Mountain, when in comparison to the much larger Great North Mountain to the south.

Summits, knobs and gaps 
Although North Mountain is a continuous mountain ridge, it is made up of a number of summits, knobs and gaps with individual names. These are listed from north to south.

 Potato Hill, 
 Skinners Gap, 640 feet (Hedgesville, West Virginia)
 High Knob, 
 Parks Gap, 1,100 feet (Dry Run Road)
 Boyds Gap, 1,480 feet (Tuscarora Pike)
 Roundtop, 
 Mills Gap, 1,180 feet (Apple Harvest Drive and Gerrardstown Road)
 Dutton Gap, 1,290 feet

Landforms of Berkeley County, West Virginia
Landforms of Frederick County, Virginia
Ridges of Virginia
Ridges of West Virginia